Quami Ekta ('National Unity') is a California-based online newspaper and a Punjabi weekly print newspaper targeting Punjabis throughout the world. The online edition is in both Punjabi and English. The newspaper was launched in 2002 as an online newspaper and in 2004 as a weekly broadsheet print newspaper. Both the online and print edition are available free of cost.

In July 2007 Quami Ekta honored Dharmendra for his contributions to the Indian cinema.

References

External links 
 Official Quami Ekta website
 Quami Ekta English website
 Lok Media Corp website (Publisher of Quami Ekta)

Asian-American press
Indian-American culture in California
Mass media of Indian diaspora
Weekly newspapers published in California
Non-English-language newspapers published in California
Pakistani-American culture in California
Punjabi-American culture
Punjabi-language newspapers
2002 establishments in California